A software development folder or file is a physical or virtual container for software project artifacts, including: requirements, plans, designs, source code, test plans and results, problem reports, reviews, notes, and other artifacts of the development process.

Typically, an SDF is hierarchically organized by project phase, artifact type, and/or project team.

All or parts of SDF content are typically 'managed'. That is, access and changes are controlled. For electronic media repositories, this control is often facilitated using a configuration management tool such as CVS or IBM Rational ClearCase, in conjunction with a change management process.

IEEE/EIA guide 12207.1, 'Software life cycle processes - Life cycle data', provides a robust description of the artifacts that would typically be stored in a Software Development Folder.

Originally, the SDF was a binder or collection of binders containing these records, but the term and concept have been adopted widely, and evolved to include both physical and electronic media, and less centralized repositories. As such, the SDF is often represented as an index with references to its constituent repositories.

See also
Deliverable
Configuration management
Software development
Software developer
Software development effort estimation
Software development process

Software project management